Marvin the Martian in the Third Dimension (also titled Marvin the Martian in 3D and Marvin the Martian in 4D) is a 3-D Looney Tunes film formerly an attraction at Drayton Manor Resort in Drayton Bassett, Staffordshire, England, Warner Bros. Movie World in Gold Coast, Australia, Warner Bros. Movie World in Bottrop, Germany (now Movie Park Germany) and Six Flags Great America.

This is the first CGI animated feature film in history to be produced in stereoscopic 3D (viewed with 3D glasses).

History
On 26 December (Boxing Day), 1997, the film opened at Warner Bros. Movie World on the Gold Coast in Australia. The attraction opened at the Roxy Theatre in Main Street. It mixed the old art of anaglyphic or polarized film (viewed with 3D glasses), and the relatively new art of CGI (the first CGI feature-film (Toy Story) was made only 2 years before).

In 1997, it was simultaneously screened at the cinema in the Warner Bros. Studio Store in New York. During scenes when Daffy Duck spoke, the audience was sprinkled with water. A large minted token embossed with Marvin the Martian was given on entrance, and could be redeemed for merchandise.

In 2005, the Roxy Theatre saw Marvin the Martian in 3D ending its run and being replaced with Shrek 4D Adventure which also includes added real world effects to immerse the viewers into the film such as wind, water and smells.

One year later the film began showing at the Pictorium at Six Flags Great America. Though, the much larger screen size of the Pictorium suggests that there may differences from the original film seen in Australia. The version in the Pictorium started showing in 2006 and ceased two years later in May 2008.

In 2011, Drayton Manor announced that they would be replacing Happy Feet 4-D Experience with Marvin the Martian in 4D. Marvin the Martian began showing at the start of the season on 19 March 2011.

Later in 2011, this film was released on the Looney Tunes Platinum Collection: Volume 1 Blu-ray in 2-D.

In 2021, the film was shown at the Roxy Theatre at Warner Bros. Movie World on the Gold Coast in Australia for the first time since 2005.

Plot
The film is based around the two Looney Tunes characters Marvin the Martian and Daffy Duck. "While scanning the universe for signs of hostility, Marvin hears something that sounds like a threat from Earth. Daffy's preparation for his movie role as a dreaded Martian fighter causes the confusion, which results in intergalactic mayhem of comic proportions." The film is accompanied by various special effects including water and wind which would correspond to screen (e.g. Daffy spitting as he spoke).

Voices
 Joe Alaskey – Duck Dodgers, K-9 and Marvin the Martian

See also 
 Timeline of CGI in film and television
 Stereoscopy
 Anaglyph image
 Polarized glasses
 2011 in amusement parks

References

External links 
 Marvin the Martian in the Third Dimension at the Iwerks Entertainment website
 

1997 films
1990s 3D films
Amusement park films
American animated short films
Looney Tunes films
Daffy Duck films
Marvin the Martian films
Six Flags attractions
Six Flags Great America
1997 establishments in Australia
2005 disestablishments in Australia
2006 establishments in the United States
2008 disestablishments in the United States
Amusement rides introduced in 1997
Amusement rides introduced in 2006
Amusement rides introduced in 2011
Amusement rides that closed in 2005
Amusement rides that closed in 2008
Outer space in amusement parks
1990s American animated films
1997 computer-animated films
1997 short films
1990s Warner Bros. animated short films
3D animated short films
Films scored by Richard Stone (composer)